Nam Ji-sung and Song Min-kyu were the defending champions but lost in the final to Hsieh Cheng-peng and Christopher Rungkat.

Hsieh and Rungkat won the title after defeating Nam and Song 6–3, 3–6, [10–6] in the final.

Seeds

Draw

References

External links
 Main draw

Gwangju Open - Doubles
Gwangju Open